Cactus Trails is a lost 1927 American silent Western film directed by Scott Pembroke and starring Bob Custer. It was produced by Custer and Joseph P. Kennedy  and distributed through Film Booking Offices of America.

Cast
 Bob Custer as Ross Fenton, a representative of an oil company who travels to Led Horse to check on the town's conditions, only to be made deputy sheriff after an accident.
 Marjorie Zier as Sally Crater, a rancher and the love interest of Fenton. She is the niece of Aunt Crater.
 Lew Meehan as Angel, a gambler who seeks to lease a ranch from Aunt Crater.
 Roy Watson as Sheriff Upshaw, the sheriff of Led Horse.
 Inez Gomez as Aunt Crater, the owner of a ranch which Angels seeks to lease out.
 Roy Laidlaw as Jeb Poultney
 Bud Osborne as "Draw" Egan, the leader of a gang.
 Milburn Morante as Jack Mason

References

External links
 
 

1927 films
Lost Western (genre) films
1927 Western (genre) films
Films directed by Scott Pembroke
Film Booking Offices of America films
Lost American films
American black-and-white films
1927 lost films
Films with screenplays by Harry L. Fraser
Silent American Western (genre) films
1920s American films